William Swan (21 June 1791, in Leven, Fife – 18 January 1866) was a Scottish missionary in Siberia and one of the translators of the Bible into Mongolian.

From Siberia he published Letters on Missions (1830) which the disappointed book reviewer of the Imperial Magazine found to be edifying, but totally lacking in any local colour from Siberia. In 1831 Swan returned to Britain for publication of the Mongolian Bible (New Testament printed) and to visit Great Britain and married Hannah Cullen. However, when the couple attempted to return to Siberia via Saint Petersburg, Swan was arrested and held until the end of 1833. The Russian government finally suppressed the Protestant Siberian mission in 1840 and expelled the Swans and others.

References

1791 births
1866 deaths
Scottish Congregationalist missionaries
Translators of the Bible into Mongolian
Translators to Buryat
Congregationalist missionaries in Russia
19th-century translators
Missionary linguists